John Waller (January 23, 1673 – August 2, 1754) was an American politician who served in the House of Burgesses in 1714, 1722, and 1742.  His militia service under Captain John West saw him earn the title "Colonel", and a sheriff in both King and Queen (1699–1701) and King William (1701–1702) counties of Virginia.

Biography
Waller was born in England, the fifth child of Dr. John Waller of Newport Pagnell and Mary Pomfrett, who had been married on January 13, 1669. Baptized at Newport Pagnell on January 23, 1673, he migrated to Virginia as a young man in the closing years of the 17th century. This was before May 1, 1696, as on that date Waller bought 1039 acres of land in the Pamunkey Neck of King and Queen County, on the south side of the Mattaponi River. He established a plantation here which he named "Endfield", which still exists today as Enfield Sod, Inc. He was a slave owner.
 A cousin of the English Civil War parliamentarians William and Hardress Waller, Waller had a brother called William who became a Church of England clergyman and another brother, Edmund, who was a fellow of St John's College, Cambridge.

Between 1723 and 1726, Waller established another plantation in Spotsylvania County, which he named "Newport" for his birthplace in England.

As Waller is recorded as having died on August 2, 1754, it seems clear that he was not the John Waller who bought an African named Kunta Kinte after Kinte was kidnapped and transported to America about 1767. The story of Kunta Kinte is included in the 1976 book Roots: The Saga of an American Family by Alex Haley. Haley's book served, in part, as the premise for the groundbreaking 1977 miniseries Roots, as well as the History Channel remake in 2016.

Career
Col. John Waller was a justice of the peace and the first sheriff of King William County in 1701. A small building that still exists today at Endfield is said to have acted as the county's first jail. He was the first Clerk of the Spotsylvania County in 1722. His son Edmund succeeded him in 1742. In 1747 he was made a Trustee of the city of Fredericksburg.

Waller sat in the House of Burgesses as a member for King William County in the session of 1720, which was extended into 1722.

Family
John Waller married Dorothy King circa 1697. They had six children: Mary, John, Thomas, William, Benjamin, and Edmund. Mary Waller (1699–1781) married Zachary Lewis (1702–1765), and their daughter Ann Lewis married George Wythe, who signed the Declaration of Independence and taught Thomas Jefferson. Benjamin Waller (d. 1786) married Martha Hall, and their daughter Dorothy Elizabeth Waller married Henry Tazewell in 1774. Their son Littleton Waller Tazewell (1774–1860) was a senator and Governor of Virginia.

References

External links
  
 
 
 

1673 births
1754 deaths
American slave owners
House of Burgesses members
People from King and Queen County, Virginia
People from King William County, Virginia
People from Spotsylvania County, Virginia
Virginia sheriffs
Colonial American justices of the peace